Qodratabad (also Romanized as Qodratābād; also known as Qudratābād) is a village in Razmavaran Rural District, in the Central District of Rafsanjan County, Kerman Province, Iran. At the 2006 census, its population was 25, in 7 families.

References 

Populated places in Rafsanjan County